The Vessel Orchestra is a sound-based art installation created by British artist Oliver Beer. It is the first sound-oriented installation ever commissioned by the Metropolitan Museum of Art. The installation is composed of 32 objects from the museum's collection. Each object has a microphone placed in its hollow space in order to capture the natural sounds that each piece resonates. Beer chose each object for its unique pitch. For instance, a clay vase by Joan Miró resonates the musical note low F. The internal microphones, which do not touch the objects, are connected to a mixer, which is hooked up to a keyboard, therefore allowing a musician to "play" the objects, creating music. The installation was opened to the general public on July 2, 2019, and was on display at the Met Breuer until August 11, 2019. During the exhibit the installation played repeatedly a 20-minute loop of a composition by Beer. In addition, the instrument was played on Friday evenings during live music performances by guest musicians. The installation includes two and a half octaves in a chromatic scale, from low C to high G. It took Beer four years to create the installation. Some of the objects in the installation had never been on display in the museum before. The project was co-curated by Lauren Rosati and Limor Tomer.

List of works
Beer used the following objects in The Met's collection for Vessel Orchestra; works are listed as they appeared in the installation clockwise from the entrance.

References

Further reading

External links
 

Installation art works
Contemporary works of art
Interactive art
Audio works
Visual music